Fundação Cásper Líbero (Cásper Líbero Foundation, also referred to as FCL) is a Brazilian institution that is responsible for a wide communication complex, and is headed in São Paulo. It includes Rede Gazeta (TV network), Gazeta AM and Gazeta FM (radio stations, Gazeta Fm is one of the most heard in Brazil), A Gazeta (newspaper), A Gazeta Esportiva (sports website, one of the most viewed in Brazil), GazetaPress (news agency), FCL.net (internet provider), GazetaAdventure.com.br, Faculdade de Comunicação Social Cásper Líbero (which introduced the first journalism college in Latin America), Grupo de Cidadania Empresarial, BestShopTV.com (online store) and Link Interativa.

History 

Fundação Cásper Líbero was created in 1944, after the death of Cásper Líbero (in an airplane crash), an important journalist that was the owner of the newspaper A Gazeta, which was created in 1906. Following his will, the workers decided to create the foundation and the Journalism College, in 1947.

References

External links
 Fundação Casper Libero
 TV Gazeta
 Rádio Gazeta
 Rádio Universitária
 Faculdade Cásper Líbero
 Gazeta FM
 Gazeta Esportiva
 Gazeta Adventure
 Teatro Gazeta
 Reserva Cultural
 Gazeta Press
 FCL.net

Mass media companies of Brazil
Foundations based in Brazil
Organizations established in 1944
Mass media in São Paulo
1944 establishments in Brazil